A light metal is any metal of relatively low density. More specific definitions have been proposed; none have obtained widespread acceptance. Magnesium, aluminium and titanium are light metals of significant commercial importance. Their densities of 1.7, 2.7 and 4.5 g/cm3 range from 19 to 56% of the densities of the older structural metals, iron (7.9) and copper (8.9).

See also
 Heavy metals

References

Sets of chemical elements
Metals